Yang Hyang-ja (Korean: 양향자; Hanja:  梁香子; born 4 April 1967) is a South Korean politician representing Gwangju at the National Assembly from 2020 and previously served as the president of the National Human Resource Management Institute (NHI) of Ministry of Personnel Management under President Moon Jae-in from 2018 to 2019. She was the first woman to lead the Institute since the relevant position was founded in 1960s.

Samsung Electronics 
After graduating from Gwangju Girls' Commercial High School, Yang went to Samsung Electronics at the age of 18 (or 19 in Korea) as an assistant to semiconductor memory researchers at the company. Since then she had worked for the company's departments related to memory semi-conductors for over three decades. In 2014 she was promoted to the executive for its flash memory development becoming its first female executive without higher education, from Honam region and one-year earlier than her co-workers.

Yang completed tertiary education while working at Samsung. She earned a bachelor's degree from now-Cyber University of Korea, which was co-founded by Samsung in 2000, in 2005 and masters from Sungkyunkwan University, which has close partnerships with Samsung, in 2008.

Political career 
Yang was recruited by then-party leader Moon Jae-in in late 2015. She resigned from Samsung in December 2015 for her political career which began in 2016 when she officially became member of Democratic Party and later nominee for Gwangju constituency at the 2016 general election. After losing her election, Yang continued her commitment to politics. She was one of five elected members of Supreme Council of party for two years before resigning for the president of the NHI in August 2018. After serving as the first woman president of the NHI for a year, she resigned for the upcoming 2020 election.

In 2020 general election, Yang defeated six-term parliamentarian Chun Jung-bae becoming the only woman representing a district in Honam region. She is expected to join her party's Supreme Council again as she is the only woman running for this post and at least one woman should be elected. In August 2020 she re-joined the Supreme Council receiving fifth most votes.

In September newly elected leader of her party, Lee Nak-yon, appointed Yang and Han Jeoung-ae as the co-deputy chair of party's K-New Deal Committee led by party floor leader Kim Tae-nyeon. From September she also chairs party's task force for economy and people's livelihood.

On July 15, 2021, Yang was expelled from the Democratic Party for her handling of sexual misconduct in her office. A female employee of Yang's regional office in Gwangju complained of sexual harassment by Yang's cousin, who also worked at the office. Yang then inflicted second punishment by gaslighting the victim, ignoring the complaints, and denying the situation in interviews.

Electoral history

Published works 
Yang's biography, Fly Towards Dream Beyond Dream, Hyang-ja

References 

1967 births
Sungkyunkwan University alumni
People from Gwangju
Living people
Minjoo Party of Korea politicians
Members of the National Assembly (South Korea)
South Korean government officials
South Korean women in business
South Korean women engineers
Female members of the National Assembly (South Korea)